Armand Désiré Gautier (19 June 1825 – 29 January 1894) was a French painter and lithographer. He was a student of Léon Cogniet. He was named "the Painter of the Sisters of Charity", and the E. Boudin Museum preserves one of his works.

References

External links
 
 Armand Gautier at Scholar's Resource
 Armand Désiré Gautier at artprice.com

1825 births
1894 deaths
19th-century French painters
French male painters
19th-century French male artists